Dotzigen railway station is a railway station in the municipality of Dotzigen, in the Swiss canton of Bern. It is an intermediate stop on the standard gauge  of Swiss Federal Railways.

Services 
The following services stop at Dotzigen:

References

External links 
 
 

Railway stations in the canton of Bern
Swiss Federal Railways stations